Omar Ahmed Majumder is a Bangladesh Awami League politician and the former Member of Parliament of Comilla-11.

Career
Majumder was elected to parliament from Comilla-11 as a Bangladesh Awami League candidate in 1986 and 1988.

References

Awami League politicians
Living people
3rd Jatiya Sangsad members
4th Jatiya Sangsad members
Year of birth missing (living people)